Christopher Collins Warren II (born January 24, 1967) is an American former professional football player who was a running back in the National Football League (NFL) for 11 seasons. He played from 1990 to 2000, primarily for the Seattle Seahawks, but also for the Dallas Cowboys and the Philadelphia Eagles.

Early years
Born in Silver Spring, Maryland, Warren was raised in the metropolitan Washington, D.C. area and attended Robinson Secondary School in Fairfax, Virginia.  After an outstanding high school football career with the Rams, he graduated in 1985 and enrolled at the University of Virginia in Charlottesville, but transferred after two years with the Cavaliers and finished at Ferrum College, a Division III school in rural southwestern Virginia.  He was selected by the Seahawks in the fourth round (89th overall) of the 1990 NFL draft.

Professional career

Initially seeing action as a kick returner, Warren's breakout season as a professional came in 1992, when he rushed for 1,017 yards.  He followed that season with three more years with at least 1,000 yards rushing, setting a career-high in 1994 with 1,545 rushing yards.  In 1995, Warren set another career-best with 15 rushing touchdowns.

Warren was a three-time selection for Pro Bowl in three consecutive seasons (1993, 1994, & 1995).  By the end of his stint in Seattle he held the Seahawks' career rushing record, logging 6,706 total rushing yards for the franchise from 1990 to 1997.  In 2005 Shaun Alexander eclipsed that record.

In 2018, Warren is a Pro Football Hall of Fame nominee along with fellow Seahawks running backs Shaun Alexander and Ricky Watters.

Car crash
On December 1, 1994, Warren and teammates Lamar Smith and Mike Frier were involved in a collision in Kirkland, Washington, in which Smith's vehicle crashed into a utility pole. Warren and Smith walked away with minor injuries, while Frier took the brunt of the impact, becoming paralyzed from the waist down as a result.

NFL career statistics

Personal life
Warren now helps out coaching for the Edison High School football team in Alexandria, Virginia. Warren has two sons, Chris III and Conlin, and two daughters, Ariana and Kayla. Chris Warren III was a running back for the Texas Longhorns for the 2015 through 2017 seasons; he then declared for the 2018 NFL Draft. On May 7, 2018, Chris Warren III signed an undrafted free agent contract with the Oakland Raiders. As of 2020, he is the running back coach for the Thomas Jefferson High School for Science and Technology.

Honors
1990: First-team All Rookie by Pro Football Weekly, College and Pro Football Newsweekly.
1991: First-team All-AFC by Football News.
1993: AFC Pro Bowl Squad, AFC Offensive Player of Week 3 (At New England)
1994: AFC Pro Bowl Squad, Seahawks Most Valuable Player (Voted By Teammates), First-team All-AFC (Pro Football Weekly\Pro Football Writers Association/Football News), Second-team All-NFL by Associated Press, College and Pro Newsweekly, Football Digest, AFC Offensive Player of Week 5 (At Pittsburgh 9/25).
1995: AFC Pro Bowl Starter; Seahawks Most Valuable Player (Voted By Teammates); First-team All-AFC (Pro Football Weekly/Pro Football Writers Association, United Press International, Football News), Second-team All-NFL (AP, College and Pro Football NewsWeekly, Football Digest); All-Madden Team (Selected By FOX-TV's NFL Analyst John Madden)

References

External links
 

1967 births
Living people
American football running backs
Dallas Cowboys players
Ferrum Panthers football players
Seattle Seahawks players
Virginia Cavaliers football players
Philadelphia Eagles players
American Conference Pro Bowl players
Sportspeople from Fairfax County, Virginia
People from Silver Spring, Maryland
Players of American football from Virginia
Robinson Secondary School alumni